Tyrone Charles (born 30 November 1988) is a Trinidadian international footballer who plays for Club Sando as a left winger or forward.

Career
Born in Port of Spain, he has played club football for Central, St. Ann's Rangers, Caledonia AIA, North East Stars, San Juan Jabloteh and Club Sando.

He made his international debut for Trinidad and Tobago in 2015.

References

1996 births
Living people
Trinidad and Tobago footballers
Trinidad and Tobago international footballers
Central F.C. players
St. Ann's Rangers F.C. players
Morvant Caledonia United players
North East Stars F.C. players
San Juan Jabloteh F.C. players
Club Sando F.C. players
Association football wingers